Didier-Léon Marchard (1 November 1925 – 16 February 2022) was a French Roman Catholic bishop.

Marchard was born in France and was ordained to the priesthood in 1951. He served as bishop of the Roman Catholic Diocese of Valence, France from 1978 until his retirement in 2001. Marchand died on 16 February 2022, at the age of 96.

References

1925 births
2022 deaths
20th-century Roman Catholic bishops in France
21st-century Roman Catholic bishops in France
Bishops of Valence
Grenoble Alpes University alumni